David C. Johnson (born January 30, 1940 in Batavia, New York) is an American composer, flautist, and performer of live electronic music.

Life and career 
Johnson studied, among other places, at Harvard University (M.A. in composition 1964), with Nadia Boulanger in Paris, and at the Cologne Courses for New Music in 1964–1965, 1965–1966, and 1966–1967.

In 1966–67 he was an independent collaborator at the Electronic Studio of the WDR, where he assisted Karlheinz Stockhausen with the production of his electronic work Hymnen. He also operated the live-electronics in the first performances of the chamber-orchestra version of Stockhausen's Mixtur (1967), and in the Darmstadt collaborative works directed by Stockhausen, Ensemble in 1967 and Musik für ein Haus in 1968.

In 1968 he was also instructor of electronic music at the Cologne Courses for New Music. From its formation in Cologne in 1968, he collaborated with the experimental beat group, later known as Can, formed by bass guitarist Holger Schüring (later known as Holger Czukay), keyboardist Irmin Schmidt, guitarist Michael Karoli and drummer Jaki Liebezeit. He left in 1969, disappointed at their growing rock influences.

In 1970 he performed in a number of Stockhausen's "process" works (Spiral, Pole, Expo) at the German pavilion of Expo '70, the Osaka world's fair. After Osaka, together with Johannes Fritsch and Rolf Gehlhaar, he founded in 1971 the Feedback Studio in Cologne and became a technical collaborator in the Studio for Electronic Music of Utrecht University.

In the early 1970s, Johnson joined the Oeldorf Group, a musicians' cooperative, with Péter Eötvös, Mesías Maiguashca, Gaby Schumacher (cello) and Joachim Krist (viola), who organized a Summer Night Music series.

In 1972, with Helmut Lachenmann, he coordinated the Composition Studio at the Darmstadt International Summer Courses for New Music. He remained technical director of the Feedback Studio until 1975, when he moved to Basel to become director of the electronic studio of the City of Basel Music Academy there, a post he held until 1985. He now lives in Switzerland.

Compositions
 Three Pieces for string quartet (1966)
 Dort wo wir leben, electronic music for the documentary film by Kazimierz Karabasz (1967)
 TeleFun, electronic music (1968)
 Ton-Antiton, electronic music (1968)
 Prorganica, sound installation (1970)
 Organica I–IV, sound installations (1970–72)
 Triangles, for flute, clarinet, cello, and 3 ring modulators (1975)
 Ars Subtilior Electrica, electronic music, realised in the Electronic Studio of the Musikakademie Basel (1977)
  Drop Fruit, for tape, live-electronics, slides and accompanying events (1984)
 Of burning a candle, for tape and slides (1985)
 Imprisoned Fruit, Cybernetic Soundspace (1989/90)
 Earth Wisdom, for tape, live-electronics and slides (1990)

References

Cited sources

Further reading 
 Johnson, David. 1972. "Die Organica Geschichte." Feedback papers 7. Reprinted in Feedback Papers 1–16, pp. 168–177.
 Morawska-Büngeler, Marietta. 1988. Schwingende Elektronen: Eine Dokumentation über das Studio für Elektronische Musik des Westdeutschen Rundfunk in Köln 1951–1986. Cologne-Rodenkirchen: P. J. Tonger Musikverlag.

External links
 Profile, Feedback Studio Publishing (in German)

1940 births
Living people
American male classical composers
American classical composers
Harvard University alumni
20th-century classical composers
21st-century classical composers
Can (band) members
People from Batavia, New York
Musicians from New York (state)
American flautists
Pupils of Karlheinz Stockhausen
21st-century American composers
20th-century American composers
20th-century flautists
21st-century flautists